Semiotics (also called semiotic studies) is the systematic study of sign processes (semiosis) and meaning making. Semiosis is any activity, conduct, or process that involves signs, where a sign is defined as anything that communicates something, usually called a meaning, to the sign's interpreter. The meaning can be intentional, such as a word uttered with a specific meaning; or unintentional, such as a symptom being a sign of a particular medical condition. Signs can also communicate feelings (which are usually not considered meanings) and may communicate internally (through thought itself) or through any of the senses: visual, auditory, tactile, olfactory, or gustatory (taste). Contemporary semiotics is a branch of science that studies meaning-making and various types of knowledge.

The semiotic tradition explores the study of signs and symbols as a significant part of communications. Unlike linguistics, semiotics also studies non-linguistic sign systems. Semiotics includes the study of signs and sign processes, indication, designation, likeness, analogy, allegory, metonymy, metaphor, symbolism, signification, and communication.

Semiotics is frequently seen as having important anthropological and sociological dimensions; for example the Italian semiotician and novelist Umberto Eco proposed that every cultural phenomenon may be studied as communication. Some semioticians focus on the logical dimensions of the science, however. They examine areas also belonging to the life sciences—such as how organisms make predictions about, and adapt to, their semiotic niche in the world (see semiosis). Fundamental semiotic theories take signs or sign systems as their object of study; applied semiotics analyzes cultures and cultural artifacts according to the ways they construct meaning through their being signs. The communication of information in living organisms is covered in biosemiotics (including zoosemiotics and phytosemiotics).

Semiotics is not to be confused with the Saussurean tradition called semiology, which is a subset of semiotics.

History and terminology 
The importance of signs and signification has been recognized throughout much of the history of philosophy and psychology. The term derives . For the Greeks, 'signs' occurred in the world of nature and 'symbols' in the world of culture. As such, Plato and Aristotle explored the relationship between signs and the world.

It would not be until Augustine of Hippo that the nature of the sign would be considered within a conventional system. Augustine introduced a thematic proposal for uniting the two under the notion of 'sign' (signum) as transcending the nature-culture divide and identifying symbols as no more than a species (or sub-species) of signum. A monograph study on this question would be done by Manetti (1987). These theories have had a lasting effect in Western philosophy, especially through scholastic philosophy.

The general study of signs that began in Latin with Augustine culminated with the 1632 Tractatus de Signis of John Poinsot and then began anew in late modernity with the attempt in 1867 by Charles Sanders Peirce to draw up a "new list of categories". More recently Umberto Eco, in his Semiotics and the Philosophy of Language, has argued that semiotic theories are implicit in the work of most, perhaps all, major thinkers.

John Locke 
John Locke (1690), himself a man of medicine, was familiar with this 'semeiotics' as naming a specialized branch within medical science. In his personal library were two editions of Scapula's 1579 abridgement of Henricus Stephanus' Thesaurus Graecae Linguae, which listed "σημειωτική" as the name for 'diagnostics', the branch of medicine concerned with interpreting symptoms of disease ("symptomatology"). Indeed, physician and scholar Henry Stubbe (1670) had transliterated this term of specialized science into English precisely as "semeiotics," marking the first use of the term in English:Locke would use the term sem(e)iotike in An Essay Concerning Human Understanding (book IV, chap. 21), in which he explains how science may be divided into three parts:

Locke then elaborates on the nature of this third category, naming it "Σημειωτική" (Semeiotike), and explaining it as "the doctrine of signs" in the following terms:

Juri Lotman would introduce Eastern Europe to semiotics and adopt Locke's coinage ("Σημειωτική") as the name to subtitle his founding at the University of Tartu in Estonia in 1964 of the first semiotics journal, Sign Systems Studies.

Ferdinand de Saussure 
Ferdinand de Saussure founded his semiotics, which he called semiology, in the social sciences:

Thomas Sebeok would assimilate "semiology" to "semiotics" as a part to a whole, and was involved in choosing the name Semiotica for the first international journal devoted to the study of signs. Saussurean semiotics have exercised a great deal of influence on the schools of Structuralism and Post-Structuralism. Jacques Derrida, for example, takes as his object the Saussurean relationship of signifier and signified, asserting that signifier and signified are not fixed, coining the expression différance, relating to the endless deferral of meaning, and to the absence of a 'transcendent signified'.

Charles Sanders Peirce 
In the nineteenth century, Charles Sanders Peirce defined what he termed "semiotic" (which he would sometimes spell as "semeiotic") as the "quasi-necessary, or formal doctrine of signs," which abstracts "what must be the characters of all signs used by…an intelligence capable of learning by experience," and which is philosophical logic pursued in terms of signs and sign processes.

Peirce's perspective is considered as philosophical logic studied in terms of signs that are not always linguistic or artificial, and sign processes, modes of inference, and the inquiry process in general. The Peircean semiotic addresses not only the external communication mechanism, as per Saussure, but the internal representation machine, investigating sign processes, and modes of inference, as well as the whole inquiry process in general.

Peircean semiotic is triadic, including sign, object, interpretant, as opposed to the dyadic Saussurian tradition (signifier, signified). Peircean semiotics further subdivides each of the three triadic elements into three sub-types, positing the existence of signs that are symbols; semblances ("icons"); and "indices," i.e., signs that are such through a factual connection to their objects.

Peircean scholar and editor Max H. Fisch (1978) would claim that "semeiotic" was Peirce's own preferred rendering of Locke's σημιωτική. Charles W. Morris followed Peirce in using the term "semiotic" and in extending the discipline beyond human communication to animal learning and use of signals.

While the Saussurean semiotic is dyadic (sign/syntax, signal/semantics), the Peircean semiotic is triadic (sign, object, interpretant), being conceived as philosophical logic studied in terms of signs that are not always linguistic or artificial.

Peirce's list of categories 
Peirce would aim to base his new list directly upon experience precisely as constituted by action of signs, in contrast with the list of Aristotle's categories which aimed to articulate within experience the dimension of being that is independent of experience and knowable as such, through human understanding.

The estimative powers of animals interpret the environment as sensed to form a "meaningful world" of objects, but the objects of this world (or "Umwelt", in Jakob von Uexküll's term) consist exclusively of objects related to the animal as desirable (+), undesirable (–), or "safe to ignore" (0).

In contrast to this, human understanding adds to the animal "Umwelt" a relation of self-identity within objects which transforms objects experienced into things as well as +, –, 0 objects. Thus, the generically animal objective world as "Umwelt", becomes a species-specifically human objective world or "Lebenswelt" (life-world), wherein linguistic communication, rooted in the biologically underdetermined "Innenwelt" (inner-world) of humans, makes possible the further dimension of cultural organization within the otherwise merely social organization of non-human animals whose powers of observation may deal only with directly sensible instances of objectivity.

This further point, that human culture depends upon language understood first of all not as communication, but as the biologically underdetermined aspect or feature of the human animal's "Innenwelt", was originally clearly identified by Thomas A. Sebeok.<ref>Sebeok, Thomas A. 1986. "Communication, Language, and Speech. Evolutionary Considerations." Pp. 10–16 in I Think I Am A Verb. More Contributions to the Doctrine of Signs. New York: Plenum Press. Published lecture.

Original lecture title "The Evolution of Communication and the Origin of Language," in International Summer Institute for Semiotic and Structural Studies Colloquium on 'Phylogeny and Ontogeny of Communication Systems (June 1–3, 1984).</ref> Sebeok also played the central role in bringing Peirce's work to the center of the semiotic stage in the twentieth century, first with his expansion of the human use of signs ("anthroposemiosis") to include also the generically animal sign-usage ("zoösemiosis"), then with his further expansion of semiosis to include the vegetative world ("phytosemiosis"). Such would initially be based on the work of Martin Krampen, but takes advantage of Peirce's point that an interpretant, as the third item within a sign relation, "need not be mental."Peirce, Charles Sanders. 1977 [1908]. "letter to Lady Welby 23 December 1908" [letter]. Pp. 73–86 in Semiotic and Significs: The Correspondence between C. S. Peirce and Victoria Lady Welby, edited by C. S. Hardwick and J. Cook. Bloomington, IN: Indiana University Press.

Peirce distinguished between the interpretant and the interpreter. The interpretant is the internal, mental representation that mediates between the object and its sign. The interpreter is the human who is creating the interpretant. Peirce's "interpretant" notion opened the way to understanding an action of signs beyond the realm of animal life (study of "phytosemiosis" + "zoösemiosis" + "anthroposemiosis" = biosemiotics), which was his first advance beyond Latin Age semiotics.

Other early theorists in the field of semiotics include Charles W. Morris.  Writing in 1951, Jozef Maria Bochenski surveyed the field in this way:  "Closely related to mathematical logic is the so-called semiotics (Charles Morris) which is now commonly employed by mathematical logicians.  Semiotics is the theory of symbols and falls in three parts, (1) logical syntax, the theory of the mutual relations of symbols, (2) logical semantics, the theory of the relations between the symbol and what the symbol stands for, and (3) logical pragmatics, the relations between symbols, their meanings and the users of the symbols."  Max Black argued that the work of Bertrand Russell was seminal in the field.

 Formulations and subfields 

Semioticians classify signs or sign systems in relation to the way they are transmitted (see modality). This process of carrying meaning depends on the use of codes that may be the individual sounds or letters that humans use to form words, the body movements they make to show attitude or emotion, or even something as general as the clothes they wear. To coin a word to refer to a thing (see lexical words), the community must agree on a simple meaning (a denotative meaning) within their language, but that word can transmit that meaning only within the language's grammatical structures and codes (see syntax and semantics). Codes also represent the values of the culture, and are able to add new shades of connotation to every aspect of life.

To explain the relationship between semiotics and communication studies, communication is defined as the process of transferring data and-or meaning from a source to a receiver. Hence, communication theorists construct models based on codes, media, and contexts to explain the biology, psychology, and mechanics involved. Both disciplines recognize that the technical process cannot be separated from the fact that the receiver must decode the data, i.e., be able to distinguish the data as salient, and make meaning out of it. This implies that there is a necessary overlap between semiotics and communication. Indeed, many of the concepts are shared, although in each field the emphasis is different. In Messages and Meanings: An Introduction to Semiotics, Marcel Danesi (1994) suggested that semioticians' priorities were to study signification first, and communication second. A more extreme view is offered by Jean-Jacques Nattiez who, as a musicologist, considered the theoretical study of communication irrelevant to his application of semiotics.

 Syntactics 

Semiotics differs from linguistics in that it generalizes the definition of a sign to encompass signs in any medium or sensory modality. Thus it broadens the range of sign systems and sign relations, and extends the definition of language in what amounts to its widest analogical or metaphorical sense. The branch of semiotics that deals with such formal relations between signs or expressions in abstraction from their signification and their interpreters, or—more generally—with formal properties of symbol systems (specifically, with reference to linguistic signs, syntax) is referred to as syntactics.

Peirce's definition of the term "semiotic" as the study of necessary features of signs also has the effect of distinguishing the discipline from linguistics as the study of contingent features that the world's languages happen to have acquired in the course of their evolutions. From a subjective standpoint, perhaps more difficult is the distinction between semiotics and the philosophy of language. In a sense, the difference lies between separate traditions rather than subjects. Different authors have called themselves "philosopher of language" or "semiotician." This difference does not match the separation between analytic and continental philosophy. On a closer look, there may be found some differences regarding subjects. Philosophy of language pays more attention to natural languages or to languages in general, while semiotics is deeply concerned with non-linguistic signification. Philosophy of language also bears connections to linguistics, while semiotics might appear closer to some of the humanities (including literary theory) and to cultural anthropology.

 Cognitive semiotics 
Semiosis or semeiosis is the process that forms meaning from any organism's apprehension of the world through signs. Scholars who have talked about semiosis in their subtheories of semiotics include C. S. Peirce, John Deely, and Umberto Eco. Cognitive semiotics is combining methods and theories developed in the disciplines of semiotics and the humanities, with providing new information into human signification and its manifestation in cultural practices. The research on cognitive semiotics brings together semiotics from linguistics, cognitive science, and related disciplines on a common meta-theoretical platform of concepts, methods, and shared data.

Cognitive semiotics may also be seen as the study of meaning-making by employing and integrating methods and theories developed in the cognitive sciences. This involves conceptual and textual analysis as well as experimental investigations. Cognitive semiotics initially was developed at the Center for Semiotics at Aarhus University (Denmark), with an important connection with the Center of Functionally Integrated Neuroscience (CFIN) at Aarhus Hospital. Amongst the prominent cognitive semioticians are Per Aage Brandt, Svend Østergaard, Peer Bundgård, Frederik Stjernfelt, Mikkel Wallentin, Kristian Tylén, Riccardo Fusaroli, and Jordan Zlatev. Zlatev later in co-operation with Göran Sonesson established CCS (Center for Cognitive Semiotics) at Lund University, Sweden.

 Finite semiotics Finite semiotics, developed by Cameron Shackell (2018, 2019),Shackell, Cameron. 2018. "Finite semiotics: A new theoretical basis for the information age." Cross-Inter-Multi-Trans: Proceedings of the 13th World Congress of the International Association for Semiotic Studies (IASS/AIS). IASS Publications & International Semiotics Institute. Retrieved 2020-01-25. aims to unify existing theories of semiotics for application to the post-Baudrillardian world of ubiquitous technology. Its central move is to place the finiteness of thought at the root of semiotics and the sign as a secondary but fundamental analytical construct. The theory contends that the levels of reproduction that technology is bringing to human environments demands this reprioritisation if semiotics is to remain relevant in the face of effectively infinite signs. The shift in emphasis allows practical definitions of many core constructs in semiotics which Shackell has applied to areas such as human computer interaction, creativity theory, and a computational semiotics method for generating semiotic squares from digital texts.

 Pictorial semiotics Pictorial semiotics is intimately connected to art history and theory. It goes beyond them both in at least one fundamental way, however. While art history has limited its visual analysis to a small number of pictures that qualify as "works of art", pictorial semiotics focuses on the properties of pictures in a general sense, and on how the artistic conventions of images can be interpreted through pictorial codes. Pictorial codes are the way in which viewers of pictorial representations seem automatically to decipher the artistic conventions of images by being unconsciously familiar with them.

According to Göran Sonesson, a Swedish semiotician, pictures can be analyzed by three models: (a) the narrative model, which concentrates on the relationship between pictures and time in a chronological manner as in a comic strip; (b) the rhetoric model, which compares pictures with different devices as in a metaphor; and (c) the Laokoon model, which considers the limits and constraints of pictorial expressions by comparing textual mediums that utilize time with visual mediums that utilize space.

The break from traditional art history and theory—as well as from other major streams of semiotic analysis—leaves open a wide variety of possibilities for pictorial semiotics. Some influences have been drawn from phenomenological analysis, cognitive psychology, structuralist, and cognitivist linguistics, and visual anthropology and sociology.

 Globalization 
Studies have shown that semiotics may be used to make or break a brand. Culture codes strongly influence whether a population likes or dislikes a brand's marketing, especially internationally. If the company is unaware of a culture's codes, it runs the risk of failing in its marketing. Globalization has caused the development of a global consumer culture where products have similar associations, whether positive or negative, across numerous markets.

Mistranslations may lead to instances of "Engrish" or "Chinglish", terms for unintentionally humorous cross-cultural slogans intended to be understood in English. This may be caused by a sign that, in Peirce's terms, mistakenly indexes or symbolizes something in one culture, that it does not in another. In other words, it creates a connotation that is culturally-bound, and that violates some culture code. Theorists who have studied humor (such as Schopenhauer) suggest that contradiction or incongruity creates absurdity and therefore, humor. Violating a culture code creates this construct of ridiculousness for the culture that owns the code. Intentional humor also may fail cross-culturally because jokes are not on code for the receiving culture.

A good example of branding according to cultural code is Disney's international theme park business. Disney fits well with Japan's cultural code because the Japanese value "cuteness", politeness, and gift giving as part of their culture code; Tokyo Disneyland sells the most souvenirs of any Disney theme park. In contrast, Disneyland Paris failed when it launched as Euro Disney because the company did not research the codes underlying European culture. Its storybook retelling of European folktales was taken as elitist and insulting, and the strict appearance standards that it had for employees resulted in discrimination lawsuits in France. Disney souvenirs were perceived as cheap trinkets. The park was a financial failure because its code violated the expectations of European culture in ways that were offensive.

On the other hand, some researchers have suggested that it is possible to successfully pass a sign perceived as a cultural icon, such as the Coca-Cola or McDonald's logos, from one culture to another. This may be accomplished if the sign is migrated from a more economically-developed to a less developed culture. The intentional association of a product with another culture has been called Foreign Consumer Culture Positioning (FCCP). Products also may be marketed using global trends or culture codes, for example, saving time in a busy world; but even these may be fine-tuned for specific cultures.

Research also found that, as airline industry brandings grow and become more international, their logos become more symbolic and less iconic. The iconicity and symbolism of a sign depends on the cultural convention and, are on that ground in relation with each other. If the cultural convention has greater influence on the sign, the signs get more symbolic value.

 Semiotics of dreaming 

The flexibility of human semiotics is well demonstrated in dreams. Sigmund Freud spelled out how meaning in dreams rests on a blend of images, effects, sounds, words, and kinesthetic sensations. In his chapter on "The Means of Representation," he showed how the most abstract sorts of meaning and logical relations can be represented by spatial relations. Two images in sequence may indicate "if this, then that" or "despite this, that." Freud thought the dream started with "dream thoughts" which were like logical, verbal sentences. He believed that the dream thought was in the nature of a taboo wish that would awaken the dreamer. In order to safeguard sleep, the midbrain converts and disguises the verbal dream thought into an imagistic form, through processes he called the "dream-work."

 List of subfields  
Subfields that have sprouted out of semiotics include, but are not limited to, the following:

Biosemiotics: the study of semiotic processes at all levels of biology, or a semiotic study of living systems (e.g., Copenhagen–Tartu School). Annual meetings ("Gatherings in Biosemiotics") have been held since 2001.
Semiotic anthropology and anthropological semantics.
Cognitive semiotics: the study of meaning-making by employing and integrating methods and theories developed in the cognitive sciences. This involves conceptual and textual analysis as well as experimental investigations. Cognitive semiotics initially was developed at the Center for Semiotics at Aarhus University (Denmark), with an important connection with the Center of Functionally Integrated Neuroscience (CFIN) at Aarhus Hospital. Amongst the prominent cognitive semioticians are Per Aage Brandt, Svend Østergaard, Peer Bundgård, Frederik Stjernfelt, Mikkel Wallentin, Kristian Tylén, Riccardo Fusaroli, and Jordan Zlatev. Zlatev later in co-operation with Göran Sonesson established the Center for Cognitive Semiotics (CCS) at Lund University, Sweden.
Comics semiotics: the study of the various codes and signs of comics and how they are understood.
Computational semiotics: attempts to engineer the process of semiosis, in the study of and design for human–computer interaction or to mimic aspects of human cognition through artificial intelligence and knowledge representation. See also cybercognition.
Cultural and literary semiotics: examines the literary world, the visual media, the mass media, and advertising in the work of writers such as Roland Barthes, Marcel Danesi, and Juri Lotman (e.g., Tartu–Moscow Semiotic School).: built on two already-generated interdisciplinary approaches: cybernetics and systems theory, including information theory and science; and Peircean semiotics, including phenomenology and pragmatic aspects of linguistics, attempts to make the two interdisciplinary paradigms—both going beyond mechanistic and pure constructivist ideas—complement each other in a common framework.
Design semiotics or product semiotics: the study of the use of signs in the design of physical products; introduced by Martin Krampen and in a practitioner-oriented version by Rune Monö while teaching industrial design at the Institute of Design, Umeå University, Sweden.
Ethnosemiotics: a disciplinary perspective which links semiotics concepts to ethnographic methods.
Film semiotics: the study of the various codes and signs of film and how they are understood. Key figures include Christian Metz.
Finite semiotics: an approach to the semiotics of technology developed by Cameron Shackell. It is used to both trace the effects of technology on human thought and to develop computational methods for performing semiotic analysis.
Gregorian chant semiology: a current avenue of palaeographical research in Gregorian chant which is revising the Solesmes school of interpretation.
Law and semiotics: one of the more accomplished publications in this field is the International Journal for the Semiotics of Law, published by International Association for the Semiotics of Law.
Marketing semiotics (or commercial semiotics): an application of semiotic methods and semiotic thinking to the analysis and development of advertising and brand communications in cultural context. Key figures include Virginia Valentine, Malcolm Evans, Greg Rowland, Georgios Rossolatos. International annual conferences (Semiofest) have been held since 2012.
Music semiology: the study of signs as they pertain to music on a variety of levels.
Organisational semiotics: the study of semiotic processes in organizations (with strong ties to computational semiotics and human–computer interaction).
Pictorial semiotics: an application of semiotic methods and semiotic thinking to art history.
Semiotics of music videos: semiotics in popular music.
Social semiotics: expands the interpretable semiotic landscape to include all cultural codes, such as in slang, fashion, tattoos, and advertising. Key figures include Roland Barthes, Michael Halliday, Bob Hodge, Chris William Martin and Christian Metz.
Structuralism and post-structuralism in the work of Jacques Derrida, Michel Foucault, Louis Hjelmslev, Roman Jakobson, Jacques Lacan, Claude Lévi-Strauss, Roland Barthes, etc.''': an application of semiotic methods and semiotic thinking to theatre studies. Key figures include Keir Elam.
Urban semiotics: the study of meaning in urban form as generated by signs, symbols, and their social connotations.
Visual semiotics: analyses visual signs; prominent modern founders to this branch are Groupe µ and Göran Sonesson (see also visual rhetoric).
Semiotics of photography: is the observation of symbolism used within photography.
Artificial Intelligence Semiotics: is the observation of visual symbols and such symbols recognition by machine learning systems. The phrase was coined by Daniel Hoeg in Semiotics Mobility's design process for autonomous recognition and perception. The phrase also refers to machine learning and neural nets application of semiotic methods and semiotic machine learning to the analysis and development of robotics commands and instructions with subsystem communications in autonomous systems context.
Semiotics of Mathematics: the study of signs, symbols, sign systems and their structure, meaning and use in mathematics and mathematics education.

 Notable semioticians 

Thomas Carlyle (1795–1881) ascribed great importance to symbols in a religious context, noting that all worship "must proceed by Symbols"; he propounded this theory in such works as "Characteristics" (1831), Sartor Resartus (1833–4), and On Heroes (1841), which have been retroactively recognized as containing semiotic theories.

Charles Sanders Peirce (1839–1914), a noted logician who founded philosophical pragmatism, defined semiosis as an irreducibly triadic process wherein something, as an object, logically determines or influences something as a sign to determine or influence something as an interpretation or interpretant, itself a sign, thus leading to further interpretants. Semiosis is logically structured to perpetuate itself. The object may be quality, fact, rule, or even fictional (Hamlet), and may be "immediate" to the sign, the object as represented in the sign, or "dynamic", the object as it really is, on which the immediate object is founded. The interpretant may be "immediate" to the sign, all that the sign immediately expresses, such as a word's usual meaning; or "dynamic", such as a state of agitation; or "final" or "normal", the ultimate ramifications of the sign about its object, to which inquiry taken far enough would be destined and with which any interpretant, at most, may coincide. His semiotic covered not only artificial, linguistic, and symbolic signs, but also semblances such as kindred sensible qualities, and indices such as reactions. He came c. 1903 to classify any sign by three interdependent trichotomies, intersecting to form ten (rather than 27) classes of sign. Signs also enter into various kinds of meaningful combinations; Peirce covered both semantic and syntactical issues in his speculative grammar. He regarded formal semiotic as logic per se and part of philosophy; as also encompassing study of arguments (hypothetical, deductive, and inductive) and inquiry's methods including pragmatism; and as allied to, but distinct from logic's pure mathematics. In addition to pragmatism, Peirce provided a definition of "sign" as a representamen, in order to bring out the fact that a sign is something that "represents" something else in order to suggest it (that is, "re-present" it) in some way: 

Ferdinand de Saussure (1857–1913), the "father" of modern linguistics, proposed a dualistic notion of signs, relating the signifier as the form of the word or phrase uttered, to the signified as the mental concept. According to Saussure, the sign is completely arbitrary—i.e., there is no necessary connection between the sign and its meaning. This sets him apart from previous philosophers, such as Plato or the scholastics, who thought that there must be some connection between a signifier and the object it signifies. In his Course in General Linguistics, Saussure credits the American linguist William Dwight Whitney (1827–1894) with insisting on the arbitrary nature of the sign. Saussure's insistence on the arbitrariness of the sign also has influenced later philosophers and theorists such as Jacques Derrida, Roland Barthes, and Jean Baudrillard. Ferdinand de Saussure coined the term sémiologie while teaching his landmark "Course on General Linguistics" at the University of Geneva from 1906 to 1911. Saussure posited that no word is inherently meaningful. Rather a word is only a "signifier." i.e., the representation of something, and it must be combined in the brain with the "signified", or the thing itself, in order to form a meaning-imbued "sign." Saussure believed that dismantling signs was a real science, for in doing so we come to an empirical understanding of how humans synthesize physical stimuli into words and other abstract concepts.

Jakob von Uexküll (1864–1944) studied the sign processes in animals. He used the German word umwelt, "environment," to describe the individual's subjective world, and he invented the concept of functional circle (funktionskreis) as a general model of sign processes. In his Theory of Meaning (Bedeutungslehre, 1940), he described the semiotic approach to biology, thus establishing the field that now is called biosemiotics.

Valentin Voloshinov (1895–1936) was a Soviet-Russian linguist, whose work has been influential in the field of literary theory and Marxist theory of ideology. Written in the late 1920s in the USSR, Voloshinov's Marxism and the Philosophy of Language developed a counter-Saussurean linguistics, which situated language use in social process rather than in an entirely decontextualized Saussurean langue.

Louis Hjelmslev (1899–1965) developed a formalist approach to Saussure's structuralist theories. His best known work is Prolegomena to a Theory of Language, which was expanded in Résumé of the Theory of Language, a formal development of glossematics, his scientific calculus of language.

Charles W. Morris (1901–1979): Unlike his mentor George Herbert Mead, Morris was a behaviorist and sympathetic to the Vienna Circle positivism of his colleague, Rudolf Carnap. Morris was accused by John Dewey of misreading Peirce.

In his 1938 Foundations of the Theory of Signs, he defined semiotics as grouped into three branches:

 Syntactics/syntax: deals with the formal properties and interrelation of signs and symbols, without regard to meaning.
 Semantics: deals with the formal structures of signs, particularly the relation between signs and the objects to which they apply (i.e. signs to their designata, and the objects that they may or do denote).
 Pragmatics: deals with the biotic aspects of semiosis, including all the psychological, biological, and sociological phenomena that occur in the functioning of signs. Pragmatics is concerned with the relation between the sign system and sign-using agents or interpreters (i.e., the human or animal users).

Thure von Uexküll (1908–2004), the "father" of modern psychosomatic medicine, developed a diagnostic method based on semiotic and biosemiotic analyses.

Roland Barthes (1915–1980) was a French literary theorist and semiotician. He often would critique pieces of cultural material to expose how bourgeois society used them to impose its values upon others. For instance, the portrayal of wine drinking in French society as a robust and healthy habit would be a bourgeois ideal perception contradicted by certain realities (i.e. that wine can be unhealthy and inebriating). He found semiotics useful in conducting these critiques. Barthes explained that these bourgeois cultural myths were second-order signs, or connotations. A picture of a full, dark bottle is a sign, a signifier relating to a signified: a fermented, alcoholic beverage—wine. However, the bourgeois take this signified and apply their own emphasis to it, making "wine" a new signifier, this time relating to a new signified: the idea of healthy, robust, relaxing wine. Motivations for such manipulations vary from a desire to sell products to a simple desire to maintain the status quo. These insights brought Barthes very much in line with similar Marxist theory.

Algirdas Julien Greimas (1917–1992) developed a structural version of semiotics named, "generative semiotics", trying to shift the focus of discipline from signs to systems of signification. His theories develop the ideas of Saussure, Hjelmslev, Claude Lévi-Strauss, and Maurice Merleau-Ponty.

Thomas A. Sebeok (1920–2001), a student of Charles W. Morris, was a prolific and wide-ranging American semiotician. Although he insisted that animals are not capable of language, he expanded the purview of semiotics to include non-human signaling and communication systems, thus raising some of the issues addressed by philosophy of mind and coining the term zoosemiotics. Sebeok insisted that all communication was made possible by the relationship between an organism and the environment in which it lives. He also posed the equation between semiosis (the activity of interpreting signs) and life—a view that the Copenhagen-Tartu biosemiotic school has further developed.

Juri Lotman (1922–1993) was the founding member of the Tartu (or Tartu-Moscow) Semiotic School. He developed a semiotic approach to the study of culture—semiotics of culture—and established a communication model for the study of text semiotics. He also introduced the concept of the semiosphere. Among his Moscow colleagues were Vladimir Toporov, Vyacheslav Ivanov and Boris Uspensky.

Christian Metz (1931–1993) pioneered the application of Saussurean semiotics to film theory, applying syntagmatic analysis to scenes of films and grounding film semiotics in greater context.

Eliseo Verón (1935–2014) developed his "Social Discourse Theory" inspired in the Peircian conception of "Semiosis."

Groupe µ (founded 1967) developed a structural version of rhetorics, and the visual semiotics.

Umberto Eco (1932–2016) was an Italian novelist, semiotician and academic. He made a wider audience aware of semiotics by various publications, most notably A Theory of Semiotics and his novel, The Name of the Rose, which includes (second to its plot) applied semiotic operations. His most important contributions to the field bear on interpretation, encyclopedia, and model reader. He also criticized in several works (A theory of semiotics, La struttura assente, Le signe, La production de signes) the "iconism" or "iconic signs" (taken from Peirce's most famous triadic relation, based on indexes, icons, and symbols), to which he proposed four modes of sign production: recognition, ostension, replica, and invention.

Julia Kristeva (born 1941), a student of Lucien Goldmann and Roland Barthes, Bulgarian-French semiotician, literary critic, psychoanalyst, feminist, and novelist. She uses psychoanalytical concepts together with the semiotics, distinguishing the two components in the signification, the symbolic and the semiotic. Kristeva also studies the representation of women and women's bodies in popular culture, such as horror films and has had a remarkable influence on feminism and feminist literary studies.

Michael Silverstein (1945–2020), a theoretician of semiotics and linguistic anthropology. Over the course of his career he created an original synthesis of research on the semiotics of communication, the sociology of interaction, Russian formalist literary theory, linguistic pragmatics, sociolinguistics, early anthropological linguistics and structuralist grammatical theory, together with his own theoretical contributions, yielding a comprehensive account of the semiotics of human communication and its relation to culture. His main influence was Charles Sanders Peirce, Ferdinand de Saussure, and Roman Jakobson.

 Current applications 

Some applications of semiotics include:
Representation of a methodology for the analysis of "texts" regardless of the medium in which it is presented. For these purposes, "text" is any message preserved in a form whose existence is independent of both sender and receiver;
By scholars and professional researchers as a method to interpret meanings behind symbols and how the meanings are created;
Potential improvement of ergonomic design in situations where it is important to ensure that human beings are able to interact more effectively with their environments, whether it be on a large scale, as in architecture, or on a small scale, such as the configuration of instrumentation for human use; and
Marketing: Epure, Eisenstat, and Dinu (2014) express that "semiotics allows for the practical distinction of persuasion from manipulation in marketing communication." Semiotics are used in marketing as a persuasive device to influence buyers to change their attitudes and behaviors in the market place. There are two ways that Epure, Eisenstat, and Dinu (2014), building on the works of Roland Barthes, state in which semiotics are used in marketing: Surface: signs are used to create personality for the product, creativity plays its foremost role at this level; Underlying: the concealed meaning of the text, imagery, sounds, etc. Semiotics can also be used to analyze advertising effectiveness and meaning. Cian (2020), for instance, analyzed a specific printed advertisement from two different semiotic points of view. He applied the interpretative instruments provided by the Barthes' school of thinking (focused on the description of explicit signs taken in isolation). He then analyzed the same advertising using Greimas' structural semiotics (where a sign has meaning only when it is interpreted as part of a system).

In some countries, the role of semiotics is limited to literary criticism and an appreciation of audio and visual media. This narrow focus may inhibit a more general study of the social and political forces shaping how different media are used and their dynamic status within modern culture. Issues of technological determinism in the choice of media and the design of communication strategies assume new importance in this age of mass media.

 Main institutions 

A world organisation of semioticians, the International Association for Semiotic Studies, and its journal Semiotica, was established in 1969. The larger research centers together with teaching program include the semiotics departments at the University of Tartu, University of Limoges, Aarhus University, and Bologna University.

 Publications 
Publication of research is both in dedicated journals such as Sign Systems Studies, established by Juri Lotman and published by Tartu University Press; Semiotica, founded by Thomas A. Sebeok and published by Mouton de Gruyter; Zeitschrift für Semiotik; European Journal of Semiotics; Versus (founded and directed by Umberto Eco), et al.; The American Journal of Semiotics; and as articles accepted in periodicals of other disciplines, especially journals oriented toward philosophy and cultural criticism.

The major semiotic book series Semiotics, Communication, Cognition, published by De Gruyter Mouton (series editors Paul Cobley and Kalevi Kull) replaces the former "Approaches to Semiotics" (more than 120 volumes) and "Approaches to Applied Semiotics" (series editor Thomas A. Sebeok). Since 1980 the Semiotic Society of America has produced an annual conference series: Semiotics: The Proceedings of the Semiotic Society of America.

 See also 

 Ecosemiotics
 Ethnosemiotics
 Index of semiotics articles
 Language-game (philosophy)
 Medical sign
 Outline of semiotics
 Private language argument
 Semiofest
 Semiotic elements and classes of signs
 Social semiotics
 Structuralist semiotics
 Universal language

 References 

 Footnotes 

 Citations 

 Bibliography 

 Atkin, Albert. (2006). "Peirce's Theory of Signs", Stanford Encyclopedia of Philosophy.
 Barthes, Roland. ([1957] 1987). Mythologies. New York: Hill & Wang.
 Barthes, Roland ([1964] 1967). Elements of Semiology. (Translated by Annette Lavers & Colin Smith). London: Jonathan Cape.
 Chandler, Daniel. (2001/2007). Semiotics: The Basics. London: Routledge.
 Clarke, D. S. (1987). Principles of Semiotic. London: Routledge & Kegan Paul.
 Clarke, D. S. (2003). Sign Levels. Dordrecht: Kluwer.
 Culler, Jonathan (1975). Structuralist Poetics: Structuralism, Linguistics and the Study of Literature. London: Routledge & Kegan Paul.
 Danesi, Marcel & Perron, Paul. (1999). Analyzing Cultures: An Introduction and Handbook. Bloomington: Indiana UP.
 Danesi, Marcel. (1994). Messages and Meanings: An Introduction to Semiotics. Toronto: Canadian Scholars' Press.
 Danesi, Marcel. (2002). Understanding Media Semiotics. London: Arnold; New York: Oxford UP.
 Danesi, Marcel. (2007). The Quest for Meaning: A Guide to Semiotic Theory and Practice. Toronto: University of Toronto Press.
Decadt, Yves. 2000. On the Origin and Impact of Information in the Average Evolution: From Bit to Attractor, Atom and Ecosystem [Dutch]. Summary in English available at The Information Philosopher.
 Deely, John. (2005 [1990]). Basics of Semiotics. 4th ed. Tartu: Tartu University Press.
 Deely, John. (2000), The Red Book: The Beginning of Postmodern Times or: Charles Sanders Peirce and the Recovery of Signum. Sonesson, Göran, 1989, Pictorial concepts. Inquiries into the semiotic heritage and its relevance for the analysis of the visual world, Lund: Lund University Press.Pictorial concepts. Inquiries into the semiotic heritage and its relevance for the analysis of the visual world .
 Deely, John. (2001). Four Ages of Understanding. Toronto: University of Toronto Press.
 Deely, John. (2003), "On the Word Semiotics, Formation and Origins", Semiotica 146.1/4, 1–50.
 Deely, John. (2003). The Impact on Philosophy of Semiotics. South Bend: St. Augustine Press.
 Deely, John. (2004), "'Σημειον' to 'Sign' by Way of 'Signum': On the Interplay of Translation and Interpretation in the Establishment of Semiotics", Semiotica 148–1/4, 187–227.
 Deely, John. (2006), "On 'Semiotics' as Naming the Doctrine of Signs", Semiotica 158.1/4 (2006), 1–33.
 Derrida, Jacques (1981). Positions. (Translated by Alan Bass). London: Athlone Press.
 Eagleton, Terry. (1983). Literary Theory: An Introduction. Oxford: Basil Blackwell.
 Eco, Umberto. (1976). A Theory of Semiotics. London: Macmillan.
 Eco, Umberto. (1986) Semiotics and the Philosophy of Language. Bloomington: Indiana University Press.
 Eco, Umberto. (2000) Kant and the Platypus. New York, Harcourt Brace & Company.
 Eco, Umberto. (1976) A Theory of Semiotics. Indiana, Indiana University Press.
Emmeche, Claus; Kull, Kalevi (eds.) (2011) Towards a Semiotic Biology: Life is the Action of Signs. London: Imperial College Press. pdf
 Foucault, Michel. (1970). The Order of Things: An Archaeology of the Human Sciences. London: Tavistock.
 Greimas, Algirdas. (1987). On Meaning: Selected Writings in Semiotic Theory. (Translated by Paul J Perron & Frank H Collins). London: Frances Pinter.
 Herlihy, David. 1988–present. "2nd year class of semiotics". CIT.
 Hjelmslev, Louis (1961). Prolegomena to a Theory of Language. (Translated by Francis J. Whitfield). Madison: University of Wisconsin Press
 Hodge, Robert & Kress, Gunther. (1988). Social Semiotics. Ithaca: Cornell UP.
 Lacan, Jacques. (1977) Écrits: A Selection. (Translated by Alan Sheridan). New York: Norton.
 Lidov, David (1999) Elements of Semiotics. New York: St. Martin's Press.
 Liszka, J. J. (1996) A General Introduction to the Semeiotic of C.S. Peirce. Indiana University Press.
 Locke, John, The Works of John Locke, A New Edition, Corrected, In Ten Volumes, Vol.III, T. Tegg, (London), 1823. (facsimile reprint by Scientia, (Aalen), 1963.)
 Lotman, Yuri M. (1990). Universe of the Mind: A Semiotic Theory of Culture. (Translated by Ann Shukman). London: I.B. Tauris.
 Morris, Charles W. (1971). Writings on the general theory of signs. The Hague: Mouton.

 Nattiez, Jean-Jacques. (1990). Music and Discourse: Toward a Semiology of Music. Translated by Carolyn Abbate. Princeton: Princeton University Press. (Translation of: Musicologie générale et sémiologue. Collection Musique/Passé/Présent 13. Paris: C. Bourgois, 1987).
 Peirce, Charles S. (1934). Collected papers: Volume V. Pragmatism and pragmaticism. Cambridge, MA, USA: Harvard University Press.
 
 Ponzio, Augusto & S. Petrilli (2007) Semiotics Today. From Global Semiotics to Semioethics, a Dialogic Response. New York, Ottawa, Toronto: Legas. 84 pp. 
 Romeo, Luigi (1977), "The Derivation of 'Semiotics' through the History of the Discipline", Semiosis, v. 6 pp. 37–50.
 Sebeok, T.A. (1976), Contributions to the Doctrine of Signs, Indiana University Press, Bloomington, IN.
 Sebeok, Thomas A. (Editor) (1977). A Perfusion of Signs. Bloomington, IN: Indiana University Press.
 Signs and Meaning: 5 Questions, edited by Peer Bundgaard and Frederik Stjernfelt, 2009 (Automatic Press / VIP). (Includes interviews with 29 leading semioticians of the world.)
 Short, T.L. (2007), Peirce's Theory of Signs, Cambridge University Press.
 Stubbe, Henry (Henry Stubbe), The Plus Ultra reduced to a Non Plus: Or, A Specimen of some Animadversions upon the Plus Ultra of Mr. Glanvill, wherein sundry Errors of some Virtuosi are discovered, the Credit of the Aristotelians in part Re-advanced; and Enquiries made...., (London), 1670.

 Williamson, Judith. (1978). Decoding Advertisements: Ideology and Meaning in Advertising. London: Boyars.
 Zlatev, Jordan. (2009). "The Semiotic Hierarchy: Life, Consciousness, Signs and Language, Cognitive Semiotics". Sweden: Scania.

 External links 

 Signo — presents semiotic theories and theories closely related to semiotics.
 The Semiotics of the Web
 Center for Semiotics — Denmark: Aarhus University
 Semiotic Society of America
 Open Semiotics Resource Center — includes journals, lecture courses, etc.

 Peircean focus 

 Arisbe: The Peirce Gateway
 Semiotics according to Robert Marty, with 76 definitions of the sign by C. S. Peirce
 The Commens Dictionary of Peirce's Terms

 Journals and book series American Journal of Semiotics, edited by J. Deely and C. Morrissey. US: Semiotic Society of America.Applied Semiotics / Sémiotique appliquée (AS/SA), edited by P. G. Marteinson & P. G. Michelucci. CA: University of Toronto.Approaches to Applied Semiotics (2000–09 series), edited by T. Sebeok, et al. Berlin: De Gruyter.Approaches to Semiotics (1969–97 series), edited by T. A. Sebeok, A. Rey, R. Posner, et al. Berlin: De Gruyter.Biosemiotics, edited by M. Barbieri (eic). International Society for Biosemiotic Studies.Cybernetics and Human Knowing, edited by S. Brier, (chief).International Journal of Marketing Semiotics, edited by G. Rossolatos, (chief).International Journal of Signs and Semiotic Systems (IJSSS), edited by A, Loula & J. Queiroz.The Public Journal of Semiotics, edited by P. Bouissac (eic), A. Cienki (assoc.), R. Jorna, and W. Nöth.S.E.E.D. Journal (Semiotics, Evolution, Energy, and Development) (2001–7), edited by E. Taborsky. Toronto: SEE.The Semiotic Review of Books, edited by G. Genosko (gen.) and P. Bouissac (founding ed.).Semiotica, edited by M. Danesi (chief). International Association for Semiotic Studies.Semiotiche, edited by A. Valle and M. Visalli.Semiotics, Communication and Cognition (series), edited by P. Cobley and K. Kull.Semiotics: Yearbook of the Semiotic Society of America, edited by J. Pelkey. US: Semiotic Society of America.SemiotiX New Series: A Global Information Bulletin, edited by P. Bouissac, et al.Sign Systems Studies, edited by K. Kull, K. Lindstrom, M. Lotman, T. Maran, S. Salupere, P. Torop. Estonia: Dept. of Semiotics, U. of Tartu.Signs and Society, edited by R. J. Parmentier.Signs: International Journal of Semiotics, edited by M. Thellefsen, T. Thellefsen, and B. Sørensen, (chief eds.).Tartu Semiotics Library (series), edited by P. Torop, K. Kull, S. Salupere.Transactions of the Charles S. Peirce Society, edited by C. de Waal (chief). The Charles S. Peirce Society.Versus: Quaderni di studi semiotici'', founded by U. Eco.

 
Communication studies
Cybernetics
Philosophy of language
+